German submarine U-168 was a Type IXC/40 U-boat of Nazi Germany's Kriegsmarine built for service during World War II. Her keel was laid down on 15 March 1941 by the Deutsche Schiff- und Maschinenbau AG in Bremen as yard number 707. She was launched on 5 March 1942 and commissioned on 10 September with Kapitänleutnant Helmuth Pich in command.

Design
German Type IXC/40 submarines were slightly larger than the original Type IXCs. U-168 had a displacement of  when at the surface and  while submerged. She had two shafts and two  propellers.

U-168 was fitted with six  torpedo tubes (four fitted at the bow and two at the stern), 22 torpedoes, one  SK C/32 naval gun, 180 rounds, and a  SK C/30 as well as a  C/30 anti-aircraft gun. The boat had a complement of forty-eight.

Service history
U-168 conducted four patrols, sinking three ships totalling  and damaging one other grossing .

First patrol
U-168s first patrol commenced with her departure from Kiel on 3 March 1943. Her route took her through the Kattegat and Skaggerak, along the coast of Norway, through the 'gap' between Iceland and the Faroe Islands and into the Atlantic Ocean south and southwest of Greenland. She arrived at Lorient in occupied France on 18 May.

Second patrol

She was unsuccessfully attacked by a Catalina flying boat of No. 413 Squadron RCAF on 3 November. Four 250 lb depth charges were dropped.

The patrol terminated in Penang, Malaya (now Malaysia) on 11 November.

Third patrol
The submarine began her third and what would turn out to be her most successful patrol when she departed Penang on 7 February 1944. One of the projectiles malfunctioned, but the other two were sufficiently destructive to send the ship to the bottom.

The Master and the Chief Engineer were both taken prisoner and handed over to the Japanese. The former's captivity prevented disciplinary action being taken over why he had ordered the undamaged ship to be abandoned and why the vessel was stationary for two hours, despite standing orders to the contrary.

U-168 also damaged the Norwegian Fenris with her last torpedo on the 21st west of the Maldives, but had no ammunition left for her deck gun to finish the ship off which continued to Bombay under her own power.
 
The boat returned to Batavia (now Jakarta) on 24 March.

Fourth patrol and loss
The submarine left Batavia on 5 October 1944. According to normal procedures to safeguard friendly submarines the U-168 gave local Japanese units its precise departure and arrival times, intended course and speed.  This was subsequently decrypted and included in a FRUMEL report on 5 October 1944. With little time, the Free Dutch Forces submarine , under the command of Lieutenant Commander H Goosens, was ordered to intercept. Shortly after sunrise on 6 October, while in the Java Sea, U-168 was spotted on steady easterly course and fired upon by a spread of six torpedoes. The torpedoes were spotted mere seconds before impact, being struck by two. One hit the U-168s pressure hull but failed to detonate. The second hit the forward torpedo room and exploded. Attempts to stem the flooding failed and the U-168 sank rapidly. The attack killed 23 men, with a further 27 being captured including Pich. In his interrogation, unaware of Allied code-breaking and signals intelligence, Pich could not explain why he'd been caught unawares with one of his crewmen blaming the Japanese, complaining that they never started anti-submarine air searches before 11:00.Pich later informed the Dutch commander that his submarine was hit three times though only one torpedo exploded.

U-168 is not believed to have made any defensive maneuvers in the action, thus it is likely that the Germans were sunk without realizing they were under attack until the torpedoes hit. The Kriegsmarine was convinced that the sinking of U-168 was the result of "loose talk" due to the crew who brought their Indonesian girlfriends aboard for a goodbye party. They also assumed that the exact position of U-168 was discovered by the Allies long before the engagement, though Dutch reports suggest that they encountered the Germans simply by chance.

Summary of raiding history

References

Notes

Citations

Bibliography

Sharpe, Peter (1998). U-Boat Fact File. Great Britain: Midland Publishing. .

External links

World War II submarines of Germany
German Type IX submarines
1941 ships
U-boats commissioned in 1941
Indian Ocean U-Boats
U-boats sunk in 1944
U-boats sunk by Dutch submarines
Ships built in Bremen (state)
Maritime incidents in October 1944